Vincent Curatola (born August 16, 1953) is an American actor. Curatola is best known for his portrayal of the New York Mafioso Johnny Sack from the HBO drama The Sopranos. He is also a singer and has appeared onstage several times with the band Chicago.

Personal life
Curatola was born in and grew up in Englewood, New Jersey, where his boyhood paper route allowed him to meet many performers. By 2007, he had moved to Saddle River, New Jersey.

Politics
In 2009, Curatola was named to the Gaming, Sports and Entertainment subcommittee transition team of then Governor-elect Chris Christie of New Jersey.

Filmography

Film

Television

Awards and nominations
Screen Actors Guild Award
2002: Nominated, "Outstanding Performance by an Ensemble in a Drama Series" – The Sopranos
2004: Nominated, "Outstanding Performance by an Ensemble in a Drama Series" – The Sopranos

References

External links
 
 

1953 births
Male actors from New Jersey
People from Englewood, New Jersey
People from Saddle River, New Jersey
American male television actors
Living people
21st-century American male actors
American people of Italian descent